Alex McNabb (born ) is a former emergency medical technician (EMT) and white supremacist podcaster from the United States, under the pseudonym Dr. Narcan. He was fired from his job after racist comments on a far-right podcast came to light.

In December 2017, Angry White Men – a website that monitors white supremacists – first mentioned McNabb to be the real-life person behind the "Dr. Narcan" persona on The Daily Shoah, a neo-Nazi podcast, as well as his position as an EMT. The website described him as "hiding in plain sight" as he openly appeared on the show in his work uniform, with no attempt to obscure his identity. On the show, he told stories of being an EMT, often using racist slurs about African Americans in particular, likening a black woman to a "shaved Harambe" (the name of a famous gorilla). In an October 2016 episode, referring to an "unruly young African American male child running around" an emergency room, he told his co-hosts on the podcast that he volunteered to take his blood, and that "Dr. Narcan enjoyed great, immense satisfaction as he terrorized this youngster with a needle and stabbed him thusly in the arm with a large-gauge IV catheter." Such catheters are not typically used for children as the needle is large and it typically bruises child patients. McNabb also said that he was open with his employer about his views, including the fact that he attended a far-right rally in Charlottesville, Virginia.

In December 2018, The Huffington Post launched its own investigation into McNabb. Christopher Mathias revealed that McNabb was a paid employee of Jeb Stuart Volunteer Rescue Squad and the subject of a November 26, 2018 complaint. Local community leaders – including the chairman of the Board of Supervisors in Patrick County, Virginia and Daniel Spencer, a black reverend – called for McNabb to be fired.

After a heated exchange, the Board of Supervisors passed a motion in a 4-1 vote condemning acts of hate and white supremacy in the aftermath, but did not halt funding to the group. Spencer criticised the supervisors for not taking action against the squad.

In March 2019, the JEB rescue squad put McNabb on unpaid leave and fired him for his comments. Although the Virginia Department of Health cleared him of any medical wrongdoing (this included discrimination "based on race, gender, religion, age, national origin, medical condition or any other reason"), an attorney for the JEB rescue squad said it was important to fire McNabb "to look out for the members of our community, and we never wanted a member of our community to think that they might be mistreated or discriminated against".

McNabb denied ever discriminating in his care of patients, claiming his comments were all part of a fictional story, that the "Dr. Narcan" persona was entirely fictitious and a form of free speech (political speech and shock jock comedy) that was protected by the First Amendment, and that he was the victim of a "witch-hunt" and smear campaign by a far-left media, which was "the enemy of the people".

In a blog post for the Oxford University Press, Tina K. Sacks links the case to medical racism in the United States and the reluctance of some African Americans to seek medical support or advice as a result.

References 

Emergency medical responders
Alt-right
American neo-Nazis
Anti-black racism in the United States
Race and health in the United States
1980s births
Living people